Los Updates are a minimal dance group formed by Jorge González of Los Prisioneros. They began sometime in the summer of 2006 after Los Prisioneros had broken up. Throughout the year they recorded some songs which will be released as an EP .

History

Loreto Otero and Jorge González are Los Updates, South American auto exiles with laptops, turntables, synthesizers and voices produce a strong sound collage, whose ultimate goal is the pleasure in the dance floor, while searching that immortal song.
Jorge joined as a singer, bassist, guitarist, programmer, songwriter and producer the legendary group The Prisoners, who sold over a million and a half albums since the mid-80s, breaking records asisitencia public (with its particular mix of electropop and new wave ) in over a dozen nations, filling two days running the National soccer Stadium Santiago in December 2001 (140 thousand people in total) and related thronging stadiums in several other countries .
Without going any further, Latin MTV began broadcasting with " We are sudamerican rockers " written, sung and produced by Jorge Gonzalez. Loreto since 2001 photographically documented every tour the band and produced the visual accompaniment of various tours.
Jorge edited vinyls parallel as a composer and singer in various electronic projects, highlighting the success of clubs " I am not the Sound" Sieg Über Die by Sonne from Germany, with whom he released the album also "+1", the hit " Tour France " by Lord Coconut, the song " Kind of Wrong " by Sussie 4 and his latest EP, " No Sleep " by Dinky.
Abandoning the comfort it gives to play in a legendary rock band in Spanish, experience in Mexico under, is a brave move and visionary hope.
The Updates are publishing their first self-titled EP in Castilian : in Mexico with the prestigious independent label " Noiselab " in USA under " National Records " in Argentina with " Secsy Music " and in Chile with Fair -La Oreja discs. Lore and George addition, under the name of Los Updates, launched in May 2007, a double vinyl through the label Cadenza in Berlin.

External links
Los Updates official website
Los Updates myspace

Chilean pop music groups
Mexican musical groups